Harper Township is a township in McPherson County, Kansas, in the United States.

Harper Township was organized in 1879.

References

Townships in McPherson County, Kansas
Townships in Kansas
Unincorporated communities in Kansas
1879 establishments in Kansas
Populated places established in 1879